Gordon is a county constituency of the House of Commons of the Parliament of the United Kingdom (Westminster), which elects one member of Parliament (MP) by the first past the post system of election. The constituency first returned a member in the 1983 general election, but has undergone boundary changes since that date.

The constituency has been represented since 12 December 2019 by Richard Thomson of the Scottish National Party.

Boundaries

1983–1997: Gordon District, and the City of Aberdeen District electoral divisions of East Don and West Don.

1997–2005: The Gordon District electoral divisions of East Gordon, Formartine, Garioch, Inverurie, Kintore and Newmachar, and West Gordon, the Banff and Buchan District electoral division of Lower Deveron and Upper Ythan, and the Moray District electoral division of Keith-Strathisla.

2005–present: The Aberdeenshire Council wards of Tarves, Ythan, Ellon Town, Logie Buchan, Meldrum, Udny-Slains, Belhelvie, Insch, Chapel and Gadie, Inverurie North, Inverurie Central, Inverurie South and Port Elphinstone, Kintore and Keithhall, Newmachar and Fintray, Huntly West, Huntly East, and Strathbogie, and the Aberdeen City Council wards of Pitmedden, Bankhead/Stoneywood, Danestone, Jesmond, Oldmachar, and Bridge of Don.

New boundaries were used for the 2005 general election. Prior to that election the constituency covered a central portion of the Aberdeenshire council area and a small eastern portion of the Moray council area. As a result of the 2005 boundary changes, in accordance with the Fifth Periodical Report of the Boundary Commission for Scotland, the Gordon constituency is now one of five covering the Aberdeenshire council area and the Aberdeen City council area.

The Gordon constituency now covers a central portion of the Aberdeenshire area and a northern portion of the Aberdeen City area. Entirely within the Aberdeenshire area, there is also Banff and Buchan, to the north of Gordon, and West Aberdeenshire and Kincardine, to the south. Entirely within the Aberdeen City area, there is also Aberdeen North, to the south of Gordon, and Aberdeen South, further south.

The towns of Ellon, Huntly and Inverurie remain within the constituency.

Keith (within the Moray council area) was transferred to the Moray constituency, Turriff was transferred to the Banff and Buchan constituency, and Kemnay and Westhill were transferred to the West Aberdeenshire and Kincardine constituency.

The Bridge of Don and Dyce areas (within the Aberdeen City council area) were transferred to the Gordon constituency from the Aberdeen North constituency.

Constituency profile and voting patterns

Constituency profile

An affluent, semi-rural constituency spanning across central Aberdeenshire and northern Aberdeen, the Gordon constituency is among the least deprived and highest-earning seats in Scotland, with a high proportion of skilled and professional workers.

The constituency covers the A90 and A96 corridors in Aberdeenshire north of Aberdeen, covering the towns of Huntly, Inverurie and Kintore situated along the Valleys of the River Don in the region of Garioch, and the towns of Ellon and Oldmeldrum in Formartine. The boundaries of the constituency stretch south into Aberdeen to the south-east, to cover the city's northern suburbs of Bankhead, Bridge of Don, Danestone and Dyce.

Oil, agriculture and tourism form an important part of the local economy, with most of the constituency's settlements around Aberdeen serving as commuter territory for the city, including the towns of Inverurie and Kintore and the villages of Balmedie and Newmachar, where there is rapid population growth, with many areas seeing their population double within the last decade. Various energy companies have representations in Dyce and Bridge of Don, among which are EMS Oil and GE Oil and Gas. The constituency also covers Aberdeen International Airport in Dyce, Scotland's third-busiest airport by passenger numbers. Huntly, approximately 40 miles north-west of Aberdeen, is the historic home of the Gordon Highlanders regiment and is the site of Huntly Castle, the ancestral home of the chief of Clan Gordon. Huntly is also the headquarters of Dean's bakers, who produce shortbread. Ellon, approximately 16 miles north of Aberdeen, is a coastal resort sitting on the mouth of the River Ythan. On the outskirts of the town is a brewery owned by BrewDog.

Voting patterns
In the UK Parliament, Gordon was traditionally a Liberal-Conservative marginal. The constituency's predecessor seats of East Aberdeenshire and West Aberdeenshire were previously represented by the Conservatives. When Gordon was first formed in 1983, it was narrowly won by Malcolm Bruce of the Liberals, with a slender majority of 850 votes. Bruce subsequently increased his majority tenfold in 1987, before seeing it cut to just 274 in 1992, in new boundaries which benefited the Conservative Party. Since the Conservatives' landslide defeat in 1997, Gordon had returned Bruce of the Liberal Democrats with an increasing strong majority until Richard Thomson of the Scottish National Party cut his majority down by nearly 4,000 votes in 2010. In the nationwide SNP landslide victory in 2015, Salmond, former First Minister of Scotland and SNP Leader, gained the seat for the SNP with a majority of 8,687 votes ahead of the Liberal Democrats; with Bruce standing down. Salmond previously represented the coterminous Gordon constituency in the Scottish Parliament from 2007 until his retirement from the Scottish Parliament in 2016.

In the Scottish Parliament, Gordon was first represented by Nora Radcliffe of the Liberal Democrats in 1999. The constituency was a three-way marginal between the Conservatives, Liberal Democrats and SNP. Alex Salmond gained the constituency in 2007 with a 2,000 majority, increasing it to over 15,000 votes in 2011. More recently the Conservatives have made a strong comeback in Gordon, gaining the overlapping Aberdeenshire West constituency in 2016, and coming second behind the SNP in the overlapping constituencies of Aberdeen Donside and Aberdeenshire East.

At the 2016 European Union membership referendum, the Gordon constituency is estimated to have voted to Remain within the European Union on a margin of 55.5% Remain 44.5% Leave, an above-average Leave vote relative to the rest of Scotland.

The Scottish Conservatives took the most votes in the area at the 2017 local council elections, prompting party leader Ruth Davidson to say on a visit to Inverurie that "We won the local government election in Gordon this week, beating the SNP into second place. It means that in this seat, as in many others, it is a two-horse race between us and the [Scottish] Nationalists." In response to Davidson's comments, the SNP MP for Gordon at the time, Alex Salmond said: “It’s just arrogance, for Ruth Davidson to continue the line of ‘we’re going to take this seat, and we’re going to take that seat’. Once it doesn't happen, it's very bad news for Ruth Davidson's credibility.”

Salmond was later unseated by Conservative Colin Clark at the 2017 snap election on 8 June. The swing to the Conservatives was 20.4%, the party's largest swing in the whole of Britain. The defeat of Salmond was a bitter blow to SNP activists in the North East who characterised it to The Guardian as,  “So disrespectful”, “How could local people do that to him?”

However, in the 2019 election, Richard Thomson narrowly regained the seat for the SNP with a majority of 819 (1.4%), meaning the seat remains an SNP-Conservative marginal.

Members of Parliament

Election results

Elections in the 2010s

This was the largest swing towards the Conservatives within the United Kingdom at the 2017 general election.

Elections of the 2000s

Before the 2005 general election, Scotland went through major boundary changes.

Elections of the 1990s

Elections of the 1980s

References 

Politics of Aberdeen
Politics of Aberdeenshire
Westminster Parliamentary constituencies in Scotland
Constituencies of the Parliament of the United Kingdom established in 1983
Alex Salmond